Brodnax is a town in Brunswick and Mecklenburg counties in the U.S. state of Virginia. The population was 298 at the 2010 census.

History

Brodnax, Virginia was a stop on the Atlantic and Danville Railway.   Due to Virginia Law, alcoholic spirits could not be sold on the Atlantic and Danville Railway train within 2 miles of Brodnax in 1896.   The Southern Railway Company, which leased the A&D starting in 1899, made significant improvements to the passenger depot in Brodnax in 1904. Today, the Tobacco Heritage Trail runs through the town on the old Atlantic and Danville Railway.

The Church Home for Aged, Infirm and Disabled Colored People was listed on the National Register of Historic Places in 2004.

Geography
Brodnax is located on the border of Brunswick and Mecklenburg counties at  (36.703422, −78.031570). U.S. Route 58 passes through the town, leading west  to South Hill and Interstate 85 and east  to Emporia and Interstate 95.

Demographics

At the 2000 census there were 317 people, 122 households, and 80 families living in the town. The population density was 450.1 people per square mile (174.8/km). There were 139 housing units at an average density of 197.4 per square mile (76.7/km).  The racial makeup of the town was 51.42% White and 48.58% African American. Hispanic or Latino of any race were 1.89%.

Of the 122 households 27.9% had children under the age of 18 living with them, 47.5% were married couples living together, 16.4% had a female householder with no husband present, and 34.4% were non-families. 30.3% of households were one person and 18.0% were one person aged 65 or older. The average household size was 2.60 and the average family size was 3.29.

The age distribution was 26.2% under the age of 18, 6.3% from 18 to 24, 27.8% from 25 to 44, 21.1% from 45 to 64, and 18.6% 65 or older. The median age was 39 years. For every 100 females, there were 86.5 males. For every 100 females age 18 and over, there were 82.8 males.

The median household income was $24,706 and the median family income was $38,750. Males had a median income of $22,045 versus $19,250 for females. The per capita income for the town was $14,785. About 10.8% of families and 18.3% of the population were below the poverty line, including 30.5% of those under age 18 and 20.3% of those age 65 or over.

References

Towns in Virginia
Towns in Brunswick County, Virginia
Towns in Mecklenburg County, Virginia